Neochirosia is a genus of dung flies in the family Scathophagidae. There are at least three described species in Neochirosia.

Species
These three species belong to the genus Neochirosia:
 Neochirosia atrifrons (Coquillett, 1910) i c g
 Neochirosia nuda (Malloch, 1922) i c g b
 Neochirosia setiger Malloch, 1917 i c g
Data sources: i = ITIS, c = Catalogue of Life, g = GBIF, b = Bugguide.net

References

Further reading

 

Scathophagidae
Articles created by Qbugbot
Muscoidea genera